Chhapian Wali (also spelled as Chhapianwali or Chhapiyanwali) is a village in Mansa district of Punjab, India. It was on the list for more than 90 per cent of voting in the February 2012 elections.

Geography 

Raipur, Raman Nandi, Baje Wala and Uddat Bhagat Ram are the surrounding villages.

Education 

The village has a government primary school and students have to go to the nearby villages or city for higher education.

References 

Villages in Mansa district, India